The men's 800 metres at the 1954 European Athletics Championships was held in Bern, Switzerland, at Stadion Neufeld on 25, 27, and 28 August 1954.

Medalists

Results

Final
28 August

Semi-finals
27 August

Semi-final 1

Semi-final 2

Heats
25 August

Heat 1

Heat 2

Heat 3

Heat 4

Participation
According to an unofficial count, 31 athletes from 19 countries participated in the event.

 (2)
 (2)
 (2)
 (2)
 (2)
 (1)
 (2)
 (1)
 (1)
 (1)
 (1)
 (2)
 (1)
 (2)
 (2)
 (2)
 (2)
 (2)
 (1)

References

800 metres
800 metres at the European Athletics Championships